Eugen Edmund Eduard Erbe (5 November 1847 – 22 January 1908) was a Baltic German lawyer, judge, and politician who was the deputy mayor of Reval (now Tallinn) from December 1905 to May 1906. He graduated from the University of Tartu's Faculty of Law. He practiced law and was a judge in what is now Estonia. He was a judge in the Estonian higher court. He eventually became a city councilor from 1883 to 1906. He eventually became the deputy mayor of the city from December 1905 to May 1906 while the position was vacated. He was succeeded by Voldemar Lender. Erbe was also president of the St. Olaf's Church convention.

See also
List of mayors of Tallinn

References

1847 births
1908 deaths
Politicians from Tallinn
People from Kreis Harrien
Baltic-German people
Mayors of Tallinn
19th-century Estonian judges
University of Tartu alumni